Xerocrassa montserratensis is a species of air-breathing land snail, a pulmonate gastropod mollusk in the family Geomitridae, the hairy snails and their allies. 

Two subspecies are recognised, the nominotypical X. m. subsp. montserratensis and X. m. subsp. betulonensis.

Geographic distribution

Xerocrassa montserratensis is endemic to Spain, where it is restricted to the Montserrat mountain chain and the mountains of the Besòs river basin in the Catalan province of Barcelona.

References

 Bank, R. A.; Neubert, E. (2017). Checklist of the land and freshwater Gastropoda of Europe. Last update: July 16th, 2017

External links

 Hidalgo, J. G. B. (1870). Description de trois espèces nouvelles d'Helix d'Espagne. Journal de Conchyliologie. 18(3): 298–299

montserratensis
Molluscs of Europe
Endemic fauna of Spain
Gastropods described in 1870